The Solomon's naked-backed fruit bat (Dobsonia inermis) is a species of megabat in the family Pteropodidae. It is endemic to the Solomon Islands.

References

Dobsonia
Bats of Oceania
Endemic fauna of the Solomon Islands
Mammals of the Solomon Islands
Mammals described in 1909
Taxa named by Knud Andersen
Taxonomy articles created by Polbot